A shilla is a male fraternity in Saudi Arabia, Egypt and other countries.

References

Society of Egypt